Xavier Bizard (1 January 1899 – 20 August 1956) was a French equestrian. He competed in two events at the 1936 Summer Olympics.

References

External links
 

1899 births
1956 deaths
French male equestrians
Olympic equestrians of France
Equestrians at the 1936 Summer Olympics
Sportspeople from Lille